Fabio Golfetti (born April 10, 1960) is a Brazilian musician and record producer, famous for his work with progressive/psychedelic rock band Violeta de Outono. He is also the guitarist of Franco-British rock band Gong since 2012.

Biography
Fabio Golfetti was born in São Paulo in 1960. He grew up listening to Pink Floyd, Gong, Led Zeppelin, The Beatles and The Rolling Stones (with their 1967 album Their Satanic Majesties Request being one of his favorite releases by them), and as a teenager he learned how to play both the classical and the electric guitar, quoting Daevid Allen, Syd Barrett, Terje Rypdal and Manuel Göttsching as some of his major influences. In 1978 he founded Lux, his first band. Lux later became Ultimato in 1981, an instrumental punk jazz/no wave band with the arrival of drummer Cláudio Souza, and later came to be named Zero in 1983, with the entrance of vocalist Guilherme Isnard (Voluntários da Pátria). With Zero, he took part in the recording of the single "Heróis".

In 1985, Golfetti and Souza left Zero and formed alongside Angelo Pastorello the influential psychedelic rock band Violeta de Outono. As of 2016 Violeta de Outono has released 7 studio albums, 2 EPs, 4 videos and 2 live albums.

In 1988 he formed a side project to Violeta de Outono, called The Invisible Opera Company (Tropical Version Brazil); heavily inspired by the aesthetics of Daevid Allen, it has released four albums as of yet.

In 2006 he appeared at the Gong Unconvention 2006 in Amsterdam with The Glissando Guitar Orchestræ. The Seven Drones (At Gong Uncon '06), a live album recording his performance at the event, was released in 2008.

Golfetti is a full-time member of Gong since 2012; he previously toured with them in 2007, during a brief series of concerts in São Paulo, as a member of their "Gong Global Family" project. A live album of the concert was released in 2009. I See You, Gong's first studio album with him as an official member of the band, was released on November 10, 2014.

In 2015 he collaborated with fellow Gong bandmember Dave Sturt on his second solo album, Dreams and Absurdities.

Discography

With Violeta de Outono

 1987: Violeta de Outono
 1989: Em Toda Parte
 1999: Mulher na Montanha
 2005: Ilhas
 2007: Volume 7
 2012: Espectro
 2016: Spaces

With The Invisible Opera Company (Tropical Version Brazil)
 1991: The Eternal Voice
 1993: Glissando Spirit
 1996: Cosmic Dance Co.
 2010: UFO Planante

With Zero
 1985: "Heróis" (single)

With Gong
 2009: Live in Brazil: 20 November 2007 (live album)
 2014: I See You
 2016: Rejoice! I'm Dead! (post-Daevid Allen)

With Dave Sturt
 2015: Dreams and Absurdities

Other works
 1994: Angel's Breath (with Angel's Breath)
 2008: The Seven Drones (At Gong Uncon '06) (with Daevid Allen and The Glissando Guitar Orchestræ)

References

External links
 

1960 births
Living people
Musicians from São Paulo
21st-century Brazilian male singers
21st-century Brazilian singers
Brazilian male guitarists
20th-century Brazilian male singers
20th-century Brazilian singers
Brazilian record producers
Psychedelic rock musicians
Progressive rock musicians
Post-punk musicians
Gong (band) members
Brazilian male singer-songwriters